is a second collaboration single between Ayaka and Kobukuro.

Overview
This single is used in Japanese commercials to promote the Nissan Cube since July 4, 2008. It was released under the Cube Loves Music! label, a joint venture of Warner Music Japan and Nissan.

Track listing

See also
 Nissan Cube
 ayaka
 Kobukuro

References

2008 singles
Ayaka songs
Songs written by Ayaka
2008 songs